The CEV qualification for the 2018 FIVB Volleyball Women's World Championship will see member nations compete for eight places at the finals in Japan.

Pools composition
42 CEV national teams will enter qualification.

First round
8 Small Countries Division teams will participate in the first round. The first round will also act as the 2017 European Championship Small Countries Division qualification round.

Second round

Third round

Pool standing procedure
 Number of matches won
 Match points
 Sets ratio
 Points ratio
 Result of the last match between the tied teams

Match won 3–0 or 3–1: 3 match points for the winner, 0 match points for the loser
Match won 3–2: 2 match points for the winner, 1 match point for the loser

First round
The top teams in each pool will qualify for the second round and the 2017 European Championship Small Countries Division final round.

Pool A
Venue:  Tórshavnar Ittrottar, Tórshavn, Faroe Islands
Dates: 23–25 May 2016
All times are Western European Summer Time (UTC+01:00).

|}

|}

Pool B
Venue:  d'Coque Gymnase, Luxembourg City, Luxembourg
Dates: 24–26 June 2016
All times are Central European Summer Time (UTC+02:00).

|}

|}

Second round
The winners in each pool will qualify for the 2018 World Championship whereas the runners-up in each pool will qualify for the third round.

Pool A
Venue:  Gradski vrt Hall, Osijek, Croatia
Dates: 31 May – 4 June 2017

|}

|}

Pool B
Venue:  Torwar Hall, Warsaw, Poland
Dates: 23–28 May 2017

|}

|}

Pool C
Venue:  Hristo Botev Hall, Sofia, Bulgaria
Dates: 31 May – 4 June 2017

|}

|}

Pool D
Venue:  Lange Munte, Kortrijk, Belgium
Dates: 31 May – 4 June 2017

|}

|}

Pool E
Venue:  Sports Games Palace, Baku, Azerbaijan
Dates: 30 May – 3 June 2017

|}

|}

Pool F
Venue:  Centro Cultural de Viana do Castelo, Viana do Castelo, Portugal
Dates: 31 May – 4 June 2017

|}

|}

Third round
The winners and runners-up will qualify for the 2018 World Championship.

Pool G
Venue:  Topsportcentrum Rotterdam, Netherlands
Dates: 22–27 August 2017

|}

|}

References

2018 FIVB Volleyball Women's World Championship
2016 in women's volleyball
2017 in women's volleyball